Osage County R-II School District is a school district serving Osage County, Missouri. In the 2013-2014 school year Osage County R-2 School District spent $7,745 per student. The school district board governed State Technical College of Missouri until 1996 when it gained its own Board of Regents.

About
Osage County R-II school district operates 1 elementary school and high school while Osage County R-I School District operates another elementary and high school in Osage County. 98% of students graduate and 60% go on to some type of education past high school. 45% of students receive free or reduce priced lunches. The average teacher makes $34,877 while an administrator averages $71,550 a year. In 2015, the district broke ground on a new elementary school closer to the local middle and high school. The new school will be bigger and closer to the other schools for better administration.

List of Schools
Osage County Elementary (K-6)
Linn High (7-12)

References

Buildings and structures in Osage County, Missouri
School districts in Missouri